Bridgwater & Albion Rugby Football Club is an English rugby union team based in Bridgwater, Somerset and run two senior teams, a newly formed senior women's team, a colts side and a youth section featuring the full range of age-groups. The first XV play in regional rugby, currently in South West 1 West following relegation from National League 3 South West in 2012. The second XV play in Tribute Somerset Premier.

History 

The club was founded in 1875. In the early 20th-century players from the club, including Robert Dibble  and Tommy Woods represented England. In World War II the Broadway ground in Taunton Road was used for allotments with rugby transferring to Victoria Park, but after 1946 the ground was restored, with the grandstand being built in 1952.

Honours 

1st XV:
 Somerset Senior Cup winners (10): 1973, 1977, 1992, 1993, 1994, 1996, 1997, 1999, 2005, 2006
 South West 1 champions: 1996–97
 London 1 v South West 1 promotion play-off winners: 2004–05

2nd XV:
 Somerset 2 South champions: 2006–07
 Somerset 1 champions: 2015–16

3rd XV:
 Somerset 3 South champions: 2006–07

References

External links 
 Official club website
 Official club Facebook page

Bridgwater
English rugby union teams
Rugby clubs established in 1875
Rugby union in Somerset